Sunday Olweny (born 21 March 1967) is a Ugandan sprinter. He competed in the men's 200 metres at the 1988 Summer Olympics.

References

1967 births
Living people
Athletes (track and field) at the 1988 Summer Olympics
Ugandan male sprinters
Olympic athletes of Uganda
Place of birth missing (living people)